Benton Township is one of thirteen townships in Fremont County, Iowa, United States.  As of the 2010 census, its population was 254 and it contained 122 housing units.

Geography

Cities, towns, villages
 Percival

Unincorporated towns
 Eureka at 
(This list is based on USGS data and may include former settlements.)

Extinct towns
 East Port at 
(These towns are listed as "historical" by the USGS.)

Cemeteries
The township contains Blanchard Cemetery and Lambert Cemetery.

Transportation
 Interstate 29
 Iowa Highway 2

Lakes
 Liebold Lake
 St Lake

School districts
 Fremont-Mills Community School District
 Hamburg Community School District
 Sidney Community School District

Political districts
 Iowa's 3rd congressional district
 State House District 23
 State Senate District 12

References

External links
 City-Data.com

Townships in Iowa
Townships in Fremont County, Iowa